Catherine Kent (born 1981) is an Australian team handball goalkeeper. She was a long-term member of the Australia women's handball team, and participated in six World Championship campaigns for Australia. 

Cathy, who hails from Queensland, was first named in the Australian national team in 2001. She has represented Australia in a total of 39 matches, which included international tours, tournaments and six World Championships – Croatia in 2003, Russia in 2005, France in 2007, China in 2009, Brazil in 2011 and Serbia in 2013. Cathy captained the Australia team at three World Championships and was named player of the match four times. She relishes as one of her greatest moments playing against Macedonia in the preliminary round at the 2007 World Championship and receiving the ‘Best Player’ award for the first time. This award is usually given to a player from the winning team but was awarded to Cathy to acknowledge the brilliant saves she made.

Cathy was first introduced to handball when she was seventeen years old during a school sporting tour, while she was playing touch football at the Australian Institute of Sport in Canberra. Handball was something she had never seen before and straight away she fell in love with this relatively unknown sport to Australians. What made it even more appealing to her besides the fact that handball is incredibly fast and takes a lot of talent to play, was that handball is an Olympic sport and that it is a Professional sport for women in many European countries.

Before getting involved in handball, Cathy also represented Australia in Ju-Jitsu and was involved in other sports – enjoyed a stint in Queensland Rugby, was Captain of u16 Brisbane Basketball, MSN Cricket Captain, Regional Touch Football and Brisbane Futsal. Cathy has two older sisters and one younger brother who have represented Australia in Ju-Jitsu.

It was after an Australia Women's Handball team tour of Hungary in 2002 that Cathy was given the opportunity to stay on and play with the u21 Junior Cornexi team in Szekesfehervar. After only four months, she returned to Australia to play in the Oceania World Championship Qualifying Tournament which Australia won to compete in the 2003 World Championship held in Croatia. She was then contacted by a Hungarian/Danish lady, Hanna Menzi, and asked if she would like to play in Denmark.

Cathy played handball in Denmark in 2003-2004 for GOG Gudme. When she was not training nor playing, she was studying Coaching at the Sports School, Oure, and was Assistant Coach to an U15 junior Danish girls team.

After difficulties with getting a Danish visa for her second year, Cathy contacted a past Australian trainer, Niklas Harris who coached and lived in Sweden. He organized a trial for Cathy with a Swedish 1st Division women's team called H65, Höör. She played in Sweden for three years [2004 – 2007], part of that time was with two other Australian players, Raelene Boulton and Katia Boyd. She worked for the club as a cleaner before deciding that she wanted her handball career to take a different direction.

Cathy was given the opportunity to trial with a ‘Professional Team’ in the French League in La Rochelle. This was where Cathy signed her first fully paid Professional contract. Cathy considers her first year in France [2007-2008] as the best season she had ever had playing in Europe. She was named the Best Keeper with the most number of saves in the Division 2 French League, saving over 304 balls for the season.

Then in early 2008, Cathy signed up for a team in Paris called Cergy-Pontoise. Out of a number of clubs which offered her a contract, she accepted Cergy-Pontoise's offer as she felt it is a great team with lots of potential and has an experienced Romanian/French Coach to train her and the rest of the team. Cathy also enjoys the excitement and the challenges in playing in the team with four Romanian and three Junior French national team player.

Kent was a vital part of French first division team Mios-Biganos-Bassin d'Arcachon claiming of the 2011 European Challenge Cup. While she described the victory as the highlight of her nine-year European career, Kent had quickly switched her focus to Australia's World Championship assault in Brazil.

Cathy had dreamt of playing professional handball since she was 17 and was ecstatic that this dream came true. She is also grateful that all her hard work and determination got her to the level she reached. During her playing career she loved the fact that when she woke up in the morning, her job was to train and to play handball. When asked where she sees herself in the next 5 years or so, Cathy said she sees herself still playing handball overseas. She thinks that she may stay overseas and be a goalkeeper trainer for a European team after her handball career. She also has a desire to come back to Australia and help develop handball further as she dreams that one day Australia would have a really strong handball league.

References

1981 births
Living people
Australian female handball players